Aarón Alexis Sandoval Ulibarri (born September 11, 1993 in Mexico City) is a former Mexican professional footballer who played for Pumas UNAM. Sandoval began his football career with Pumas' youth team, and he had limited involvement with the club's senior team, making his Liga MX debut in 2011. In 2014, Sandoval moved to Spain to join Espanyol's B team.

External links

References

Santos Laguna footballers
1993 births
Living people
Mexican footballers
Association football defenders
Club Universidad Nacional footballers
Atlético Reynosa footballers
Atlético Estado de México players
Alacranes de Durango footballers
Liga Premier de México players
Footballers from Mexico City